Linsey Davis (born October 12, 1971) is an American broadcast journalist at ABC News, who currently anchors the Sunday edition of World News Tonight the network’s weekday prime-time streaming program, ABC News Live Prime with Linsey Davis, and she is also a substitute anchor for Good Morning America and the daily ABC World News Tonight edition.

Early life
Davis graduated from the Moorestown Friends School in 1995; she earned a bachelor's degree from the University of Virginia. She has a master’s degree in communication from New York University.

Career
Davis has been a longtime correspondent for the network, reporting for Good Morning America, 20/20, Nightline, and World News Tonight, She launched the flagship streaming broadcast on February 10, 2020. The following year, it was announced that Davis would take over anchor responsibilities for the Sunday edition of World News Tonight, with Whit Johnson handling Saturday duties, following the departure of network anchor Tom Llamas to NBC News. In 2022, Adweek reported that Davis was adding radio to her responsibilities, saying she would "deliver the top stories in ABC News Radio’s national 5 p.m. ET newscast Monday to Thursday each week.” Adweek noted, Davis took on a role once held by Peter Jennings and Charles Gibson.

In addition to her anchoring roles on broadcast television, streaming, and radio, Variety states that “Since 2019... Davis has appeared alongside George Stephanopoulos and David Muir to help anchor presidential debates, election coverage and other critical news events.”

Davis is also the author of four children’s books, including How High Is Heaven? (2022).

References

Living people
American journalists
Year of birth missing (living people)